The Chinese railway tunnels are divided into four classes by length:

 Super-long tunnels (over 10,000 metres)
 Long tunnels (between 3,000 and 10,000 metres)
 Middle tunnels (between 500 and 3,000 metres)
 Short tunnels (less than 500 metres)

By 2008, there were 6,102 railway tunnels in operation in China. Their total length reached .

See also

 List of tunnels in China
 List of longest tunnels
 List of tunnels by location
 List of long tunnels by type
 Rail transport in China

Notes

References 

.
Tunnels, railway, Long
China, Long
Tunnels, Long